Walter E. "Jack" Rollins (September 15, 1906 – January 1, 1973) was an American musician born in Scottdale, Pennsylvania and raised in Keyser, West Virginia. Rollins wrote the lyrics to holiday favorites "Here Comes Peter Cottontail," "Frosty the Snowman," and "Smokey the Bear." The music was written by his partner Steve Nelson. Rollins co-wrote many country songs for artists such as Gene Autry, Hank Snow, George Jones Eddy Arnold and Jimmy Durante.

See also 

 :Category:Songs written by Walter E. "Jack" Rollins

References

External links 
 

Songwriters from West Virginia
People from Keyser, West Virginia
1906 births
1973 deaths
People from Westmoreland County, Pennsylvania
Musicians from West Virginia
20th-century American composers